Duke Township may refer to:

 Duke Township, Harnett County, North Carolina
 Duke Township, Jackson County, Oklahoma - see List of Oklahoma townships

Township name disambiguation pages